Crowle railway station serves the town of Crowle in North Lincolnshire, England.  Most services are provided by Northern Trains, who operate the station.  Occasional services by TransPennine Express also call at this station.

The station has very limited facilities. There is a shelter on each platform, but no other permanent buildings. A public telephone is provided on platform 1 along with timetable posters to offer train running information. Platform 2 is accessible only by a barrow crossing at the west end of the station, but step-free access is available from the main entrance onto platform 1. The disused signal box has now been knocked down and levelled off.

Service
With no service on a Sunday.

Currently, that has been reduced to a every 2 hours, again with no services on a Sunday.

In February 2013 the line northeast of Hatfield and Stainforth station towards Thorne was blocked by the Hatfield Colliery landslip, with all services over the section halted. The line reopened in July 2013.

References

External links

Railway stations in the Borough of North Lincolnshire
DfT Category F2 stations
Former South Yorkshire Railway stations
Railway stations in Great Britain opened in 1859
Railway stations served by TransPennine Express
Northern franchise railway stations
1859 establishments in England